is a city located in Kōchi Prefecture, Japan. , the city had an estimated population of 19,292 in 9966 households, and a population density of 67 persons per km².

Geography
Sukumo is located in far western Kochi Prefecture on the island of Shikoku. The islands of Okinoshima and Urugushima, the only inhabited islands within Kochi prefecture and located within the city limits. Parts of the city are within the borders of the Ashizuri-Uwakai National Park.

Neighbouring municipalities 
Kōchi Prefecture
 Tosashimizu
 Shimanto City
  Ōtsuki
 Mihara
Ehime Prefecture
 Uwjima
 Ainan

Climate
Sukumo has a humid subtropical climate (Köppen climate classification Cfa) with hot, humid summers and cool winters. There is significant precipitation throughout the year, especially during June and July.

Demographics
Per Japanese census data, the population of Sukumo in 2020 is 19,033 people. Sukumo has been conducting censuses since 1920.

History 
As with all of Kōchi Prefecture, the area of Sukumo was part of ancient Tosa Province.  During the Edo period, the area was part of the holdings of Tosa Domain ruled by the Yamauchi clan from their seat at Kōchi Castle, and Sukumo itself was a castle town centered on an outlying fortification of the domain. Following the Meiji restoration, the village of Sukumo within Hata District, Kōchi with the creation of the modern municipalities system on April 1, 1889. It was elevated to town status on December 20, 1899. On March 31, 1954, Tsukumo merged with the neighboring town of Kozukuchi and the villages of Hashigama, Hirata, Yamana, and Okinoshima to form the city of Tsukumo

Government
Sukumo has a mayor-council form of government with a directly elected mayor and a unicameral city council of 14 members. Sukumo, together with Ōtsuki and Mihara contributes two members to the Kōchi Prefectural Assembly. In terms of national politics, the city is part of Kōchi 2nd district of the lower house of the Diet of Japan.

Economy
Sukumo is a regional commercial center, with a local economy is dominated by agriculture, forestry and commercial fishing.

Education
Sukumo City has eight public elementary schools and six public middle schools operated by the city government, and two public high schools operated by the Kōchi Prefectural Board of Education. Kōchi Prefecture and Ehime Prefecture also jointly one middle and one high school.

Transportation

Railway
Tosa Kuroshio Railway Sukumo Line
  -  -  -

Highway

Local attractions
Enkōji, the 39th temple in the Shikoku Pilgrimage
Sukumo Shell Mound, a National Historic Site

Noted people from Sukumo
Azusa Ono, intellectual, jurist and politician during the Meiji era.
Hayashi Yūzō, politician and cabinet minister in the pre-war Empire of Japan.

Gallery

References

External links

Sukumo City official website 
Sukumo City official website 

Cities in Kōchi Prefecture
Port settlements in Japan
Populated coastal places in Japan
Sukumo, Kōchi